The High Commissioner of the United Kingdom to Botswana is the United Kingdom's foremost diplomatic representative in the Republic of Botswana, and head of the UK's diplomatic mission in Gaborone.

Botswana (formerly the British protectorate of Bechuanaland) gained independence on 30 September 1966. As Botswana is a member of the Commonwealth of Nations, it and the United Kingdom exchange High Commissioners rather than ambassadors. The British High Commissioner to Botswana is also the UK Representative to the Southern African Development Community whose headquarters are in Gaborone.

List of heads of mission

British High Commissioners to Botswana

1966–1969: John Gandee
1969–1973: George Anderson
1973–1977: Eleanor Emery
1977–1981: Wilfred Turner
1981–1986: Wilfred Jones
1986–1989: Peter Raftery
1989–1991: Brian Smith
1991–1994: John Edwards
1995–1998: David Beaumont
1998–2001: John Wilde
2001–2005: David Merry
2005–2010: Frank Martin
2010–2013: Jennifer Anderson
2013–2016: Nick Pyle
2016-2020 Katy Ransome

2020–: Sian Price

References

External links

UK and Botswana, gov.uk

Botswana
United Kingdom
United Kingdom
United Kingdom
United Kingdom and the Commonwealth of Nations